Cymric was a British and Irish schooner, built in 1893. She joined the South American trade in the fleet of Arklow, Ireland, in 1906.  She served as a British Q-ship during the First World War; she failed to sink any German U-boats, but did sink a British submarine in error.

After the war, she returned to the British and, later, the Irish merchant service. In Ringsend, Ireland, she collided with a tram, her bowsprit smashing through the tram's windows. In 1944, during the Second World War, sailing as a neutral, she vanished without trace with the loss of eleven lives.

Arklow schooners 

Arklow, Ireland, has a long history of ship-owning. According to local tradition, it extends back to the export of tin and copper by the Phoenicians. The fleet was locally owned, managed, mastered and manned. Each ship was an individual enterprise, each divided into 64 shares. A captain would probably have a 25% interest in his ship: that is 16 shares. The owner listed in documents was the managing owner, not necessarily the beneficial owner. The Arklow shipowners cooperated: they established their own mutual insurance company. A century ago, ownership became concentrated. In 1966 Tyrrell and Hall formed an umbrella company to operate their ships: Arklow Shipping. By November 2011 they had a modern fleet of about 45 ships.

Early career 
Two Arklow schooners, Cymric and Gaelic, were built by William Thomas in Amlwch. Cymric was launched in March 1893. Gaelic was launched in March 1898. They were built as barquentines, In Arklow, the preferred sail configuration was the double top sailed schooner. In 1906, Cymric joined the Arklow fleet and was rigged as a schooner.

Cymric was an iron schooner. She had a shallow draught of only 10.8 feet, three wooden masts, no poop deck, a flaring bow, a round counter-stern and very square yards on her fore mast. She was built by the Thomas yard for their own fleet. Her early days, under Captain Robert Jones, were spent in the South American trade running from Runcorn to Gibraltar and on to the Rio Grande, docking at the Brazilian port of Porto Alegre. In 1906 she was sold to Captain Richard Hall of Arklow.

In the new century, 1900, there was an expansion in the Arklow fleet, as larger iron-hulled schooners were purchased. Job Tyrrell purchased Detlef Wagner and Maggie Williams, while Job Hall acquired Patrician, Celtic and Cymric. In the main, all of these ships engaged in the Spanish wine trade until Detlef Wagner was sunk by UC-72 on 28 May 1917

First World War 
Three Arklow schooners were requisitioned by the Admiralty to be used as Q-ships, they were: Cymric, Gaelic and Mary B Mitchell. They sailed the Southwest Approaches, masquerading as merchantmen, inviting attack by U-boats. Their guns were concealed, when a U-boat approached, a "panic party" would abandon the ship, while the gun crews waited for their target to come into range. The expectation was that the U-boat would approach the apparently abandoned ship and would be surprised and sunk when the guns were revealed and opened fire. Great successes were claimed and medals awarded. Mary B Mitchell claimed to have sunk two U-boats in the same day.

Post-war analysis did not confirm these claims. After the war, it was concluded that Q-ships were greatly over-rated, diverting skilled seamen from other duties without sinking enough U-boats to justify the strategy.

Cymric sank a submarine in what is now called 'friendly fire'. On 15 October 1918, a J-class submarine, was on the surface outside her base, Blythe, when she was spotted by Cymric which mistook her 'J6' marking for 'U6'. Cymric opened fire, J6 tried to signal, but the signalman was killed. J6 fled into a fog bank, but Cymric located J6 again, and sank her, with the loss of 14 lives. An order under the Official Secrets Act prohibited mention of this incident until 1969.

Between the wars 

After the war, she was disarmed and returned to Halls of Arklow. The auxiliary engine remained. By now large steamers were more profitable than sailing ships for ocean voyages. However, within Ireland transport was becoming more difficult. The neglect of the networks during World War I was compounded by destruction during the war of independence and the subsequent civil war. It was more cost-effective to transport goods by sea around the coast rather than using internal road or rail. Cymric had a new career: transporting malt from ports such as Ballinacurra, New Ross and Wexford to Dublin.

It was on one of these voyages that she collided with a tram. Cymric was waiting for Mac Machon Bridge, a bascule bridge, at the entrance to the Inner Basin of the Grand Canal Dock  to open, when a gust of wind propelled her towards the bridge. and her bowsprit speared tram number 233. There are many versions of this story. Details differ, including the date, which varies from 12 February 1927 or 1928 to 21 December 1943 Research by Dr Edward Bourke established that there were two separate incidents: on Tuesday 29 November 1921, Cymric did, indeed, collide with a tram. On 21 December 1943, Happy Harry, a different Arklow schooner, collided with the same bridge. No one was hurt in either incident.

On 22 August 1922, Cymric struck the Brandy Rocks and was beached at Kilmore, County Wexford. She was refloated on 24 August 1922.

Cymric was witness to a sad event that would change the way lighthouses and lightships are administered in Ireland. At the time, they were directly controlled from the UK by Trinity House, who removed a lightship from the Arklow Bank. On 19 February 1931, the Julia en route from Glasgow to Newhaven, grounded on the Arklow Bank and was wrecked with the loss of the crew of five, two of whom were from Arklow. Cymric, with her shallow draught, discovered the tragedy two days later. It became a political issue. In 1935, the 'Irish Lights Commissioners (Adaptation) Order' was made. It is the legislative basis for the Commissioners of Irish Lights.

On Christmas Eve 1933, Cymric grounded on a bank in Wexford Harbour. Rope, which had been used the previous day in an attempt to re-float another vessel, fouled her propeller. She spent five days aground and was eventually refloated with the aid of a diver and the removal of some barrels of malt from her cargo.

Second World War 

At the outbreak of World War II, there were only 56 ships on the Irish register; 14 of those were Arklow schooners. Sailing as neutrals, these schooners played a vital role in keeping Ireland supplied.

Cymric was charted by Betsons to travel to Portugal. Betsons imported agricultural equipment and fertilisers from America. In November 1939, Roosevelt signed the Fourth Neutrality Act forbidding American ships from entering the "war zone", which was defined as a line drawn from Spain to Iceland. Cargoes intended for Ireland were shipped to Portugal. With cargoes "piling up on the quays of Lisbon awaiting shipment", Betsons chartered Cymric to travel to Lisbon to collect these cargoes. Setting sail from Ireland, Cymric would carry food to the United Kingdom. There she would collect the British export of coal and carry it to Portugal. In Lisbon, Cymric loaded the awaiting American cargo and brought it back to Ireland.

In October 1943, she had a total refit in Ringsend Dockyard. On what was to be her final voyage, on 23 February 1944, she left Ardrossan in Scotland, where she loaded a cargo of coal for Lisbon. She was sighted off Dublin on the following day – that was her last sighting. No wreckage was ever found. She might have hit a mine, been sunk by a U-Boat, or been driven by a gale into the 'prohibited area' of Bay of Biscay and been attacked and sunk by Allied aircraft enforcing the blockade.  was fortunate to survive such an attack by the RAF in that area.

Neither the Cymric or her crew of eleven was ever seen again. When Dublin's docklands were redeveloped, a new residential street was named 'Cymric Road' . It is not far from where she collided with the tram. On the third Sunday of every November, those who lost their lives on neutral Irish ships, including the Cymric, are remembered.

See also 
 Mary B Mitchell Arklow schooner
 James Postlethwaite Arklow schooner
  Arklow ship
  Arklow Schooner
 Irish Mercantile Marine during World War II

Footnotes

References

Bibliography 

 
 
 
 
 
 
 
 
 
 
 
 
 

1893 ships
Ships built in Wales
Schooners
Merchant ships of the United Kingdom
Sailing ships of the United Kingdom
World War I merchant ships of the United Kingdom
Q-ships of the Royal Navy
Maritime incidents in 1918
Maritime incidents in 1922
Maritime incidents in 1933
Merchant ships of the Republic of Ireland
Sailing ships of Ireland
World War II merchant ships of the Republic of Ireland
Missing ships
World War II shipwrecks in the Atlantic Ocean
Maritime incidents in February 1944
Ships lost with all hands